Kīlauea is an active shield volcano in the Hawaiian Islands. Located along the southeastern shore of the Big Island of Hawaii, the volcano is between 210,000 and 280,000 years old and emerged above sea level about 100,000 years ago. Historically, it is the most active of the five volcanoes that together form Hawaii island. Kīlauea is also one of the most active volcanoes on Earth, and the most recent eruption began on September 29, 2021, when several vents began to erupt lava within Halemaʻumaʻu, a pit crater in the volcano's summit caldera, and ended March 7, 2023.

Kīlauea is the second-youngest product of the Hawaiian hotspot and the current eruptive center of the Hawaiian–Emperor seamount chain. Because it lacks topographic prominence and its activities historically coincided with those of Mauna Loa, Kīlauea was once thought to be a satellite of its much larger neighbor.

Between 2008 and 2018, the pit crater Halemaʻumaʻu hosted an active lava lake. Kīlauea also erupted nearly continuously from vents on its eastern rift zone between January 1983 and April 2018, causing considerable property damage, including the destruction of the towns of Kalapana and Kaimū along with the community's renowned black sand beach, in 1990.

Beginning in May 2018, activity shifted further downrift from the summit to the lower Puna district, during which lava erupted from two dozen vents with vigorous eruptive fountains that sent destructive rivers of molten rock into the ocean in three places. The eruption destroyed Hawaii's largest natural freshwater lake, covered substantial portions of Leilani Estates and Lanipuna Gardens, and completely inundated the communities of Kapoho, Vacationland Hawaii, and most of the Kapoho Beach Lots. Lava also filled Kapoho Bay and extended new land nearly a mile into the sea. The County of Hawaii reported that 716 dwellings were destroyed by lava. Concurrent with the activity downrift in lower Puna, the lava lake within Halemaʻumaʻu drained and a series of explosive collapse events occurred at the volcano's summit, with at least one explosion emitting ash  into the air. This activity prompted a months-long closure of the Kīlauea section of Hawaii Volcanoes National Park. The eruption ended in September 2018.

Background
Kīlauea's eruptive history has been a long and active one; its name means "spewing" or "much spreading" in the Hawaiian language, referring to its frequent outpouring of lava. The earliest lavas from the volcano date back to its submarine preshield stage, samples having been recovered by remotely operated underwater vehicles from its submerged slopes; samples of other flows have been recovered as core samples. Lavas younger than 1,000 years cover 90 percent of the volcano's surface. The oldest exposed lavas date back 2,800 years.

Native Hawaiian oral history in conjunction with radiocarbon and paleomagnetic dating places the first documentation of a major eruption of Kīlauea around 1410. Western contact and written history began in 1778, with their first well-documented eruption of Kīlauea in 1823.  Since then, the volcano has erupted repeatedly. Most historical eruptions occurred at the volcano's summit or its eastern rift zone, and were prolonged and effusive in character. The geological record shows, however, that violent explosive activity predating European contact was extremely common; in 1790 one such eruption killed more than 400 people, making it the deadliest volcanic eruption in what is now the United States. Should explosive activity start anew, the volcano would become much more of a danger to humans. Kīlauea's most recent eruption (before the currently ongoing one) began on January 3, 1983, and ended in 2018. This was by far its longest-duration historical period of activity in modern times, as well as one of the longest-duration eruptions documented on Earth; as of January 2011, the eruption had produced  of lava and resurfaced  of land. Centuries prior to this event, the 'Ailā'au eruption of 1410 lasted about 60 years, ending in 1470 with an estimated volume of 4–6 km3.

Kīlauea's high state of activity has a major impact on its mountainside ecology, where plant growth is often interrupted by fresh tephra and drifting volcanic sulfur dioxide, producing acid rains particularly in a barren area south of its southwestern rift zone known as the Kaʻū Desert. Nonetheless, wildlife flourishes where left undisturbed elsewhere on the volcano and is highly endemic thanks to Kīlauea's (and the island of Hawaii's) isolation from the nearest landmass. Historically, the five volcanoes on the island were considered sacred by the Hawaiian people, and in Hawaiian mythology Kīlauea's Halemaʻumaʻu served as the body and home of Pele, goddess of fire, lightning, wind, and volcanoes. William Ellis, a missionary from England, gave the first modern account of Kīlauea and spent two weeks traveling along the volcano; since its foundation by Thomas Jaggar in 1912, the Hawaiian Volcano Observatory, located on the rim of Kīlauea Caldera, has served as the principal investigative and scientific body on the volcano and the island in general. In 1916, a bill forming the Hawaii Volcanoes National Park was signed into law by President Woodrow Wilson; since then, the park has become a World Heritage Site and a major tourist destination, attracting roughly 2.6 million people annually.

Geology

Setting

Like all Hawaiian volcanoes, Kīlauea was created as the Pacific tectonic plate moved over the Hawaiian hotspot in the Earth's underlying mantle. The Hawaii island volcanoes are the most recent evidence of this process that, over 70 million years, has created the -long Hawaiian–Emperor seamount chain. The prevailing, though not completely settled, view is that the hotspot has been largely stationary within the planet's mantle for much, if not all of the Cenozoic Era. However, while the Hawaiian mantle plume is well understood and extensively studied, the nature of hotspots themselves remains fairly enigmatic.

Kīlauea is one of five subaerial (originating under water) volcanoes that make up the island of Hawaii, created by the Hawaiian hotspot. The oldest volcano on the island, Kohala, is more than a million years old,<ref name="hvo-kohala">{{cite web| title = Kohala – Hawaii's Oldest Volcano| publisher = Hawaiian Volcano Observatory – United States Geological Survey| date = 20 March 1998| url = http://hvo.wr.usgs.gov/volcanoes/kohala/| access-date = 29 January 2012}}</ref> and Kīlauea, the youngest, is believed to be between 300,000 and 600,000 years of age; Kamaʻehuakanaloa (formerly Lōʻihi), on the island's flank, is younger and has yet to breach the surface. Thus Kilauea is the second youngest volcano in the Hawaiian–Emperor seamount chain, a chain of shield volcanoes and seamounts extending from Hawaii to the Kuril–Kamchatka Trench in Russia.

Following the pattern of Hawaiian volcano formation, Kīlauea started as a submarine volcano, gradually building itself up through underwater eruptions of alkali basalt lava before emerging from the sea with a series of explosive eruptions about 50,000 to 100,000 years ago. Since then, the volcano's activity has likely been as it is now, a continual stream of effusive and explosive eruptions of roughly the same pattern as its activity in the last 200 or 300 years.

At most 600,000 years old, Kīlauea is still quite young for a Hawaiian volcano; the oldest volcano on the island, the northwestern Kohala, experienced almost 900,000 years of activity before going extinct. The volcano's foreseeable future activity will likely be much like it has been for the past 50,000 to 100,000 years; Hawaiian and explosive activity will make Kīlauea taller, build up its rift zones, and fill and refill its summit caldera.

Structure

Kīlauea has been active throughout its history. Since 1918, Kīlauea's only prolonged period of rest was an 18-year pause between 1934 and 1952. The bulk of Kīlauea consists of solidified lava flows, intermittent with scattered volcanic ash and tephra sourced from relatively lower-volume explosive eruptions. Much of the volcano is covered in historical flows, and 90 percent of its surface dates from the last 1,100 years.

Kīlauea lacks topographical prominence, appearing only as a bulge on the southeastern flank of the nearby Mauna Loa; because of this, both native Hawaiians and early geologists considered it an active satellite of its more massive neighbor. However, analysis of the chemical composition of lavas from the two volcanoes shows that they have separate magma chambers, and are thus distinct. Nonetheless, their proximity has led to a historical trend in which high activity at one volcano roughly coincides with low activity at the other. When Kīlauea lay dormant between 1934 and 1952, Mauna Loa became active, and when the latter remained quiet from 1952 to 1974, the reverse was true. This is not always the case; the 1984 eruption of Mauna Loa started during an eruption at Kīlauea, but had no discernible effect on the Kīlauea eruption, and the ongoing inflation of Mauna Loa's summit, indicative of a future eruption, began the same day as new lava flows at Kīlauea's Puu Ōō crater. In 2002, Kilauea experienced a high-volume effusive episode at the same time that Mauna Loa began inflating.  This unexpected communication is evidence of crustal-level interactions between Mauna Loa and Kīlauea, even though these two volcanoes are thought to be fairly independent of each other. Geologists have suggested that "pulses" of magma entering Mauna Loa's deeper magma system may have increased pressure inside Kīlauea and triggered the concurrent eruptions. Mauna Loa began erupting on November 27, 2022, during Kīlauea’s ongoing eruption, marking the first time since 1984 that both volcanoes were erupting at once.

It is unknown if the caldera was always there or if it is a relatively recent feature, and it is possible that it has come and gone throughout Kīlauea's eruptive history. What is known is that the summit caldera likely formed over several centuries, with its construction estimated to have begun about 500 years ago, and its present form was finalized around 1470-1510 after a particularly powerful eruption from 1410-1470. A major feature within the caldera is Halemaʻumaʻu, a large pit crater and one of Kīlauea's most historically active eruption centers.

A series of fault scarps connecting the two rift zones form the Koa'e Fault Zone. Non-localized eruptions, typical of rift zone activity, have produced a series of low-lying ridges down the majority of the east rift zone's length. By contrast, the much smaller southwestern rift has been quiet since a rifting episode in 1974, and to date, has not been involved in the current eruptive cycle at all. The southwestern rift zone's extremity is also underwater, although its submarine length is more limited. The southwestern rift zone also lacks a well-defined ridge line or a large number of pit craters, evidence that it is also geologically less active than the eastern rift zone.

In connection with the 2018 lower Puna eruption the Hawaiian Volcano Observatory published some facts leading to the conclusion, that a catastrophic collapse would be incredibly remote. A number of cinder cones, satellite shields, lava tubes, and other eruptive structures also dot the volcano, evidence of its recent activity. Kīlauea has some interactions with Mauna Loa, its larger neighbor and only other recently active volcano on the island; interspersed lava flows and ash deposits belonging to its neighbor have been found on its flanks, and some of Mauna Loa's flows are, in turn, blanketed in Kīlauea tephra. In particular, the saddle between the two volcanoes is currently depressed, and is likely to fill over in the future.

All historical eruptions at Kīlauea have occurred at one of three places: its summit caldera, its eastern rift zone, or its southwestern rift zone. Half of Kīlauea's historical eruptions have occurred at or near Kīlauea's summit caldera. Activity there was nearly continuous for much of the 19th century, capped by a massive explosive eruption in 1924, before petering out by 1934. Recent activity has mostly shifted to Kīlauea's eastern rift zone, the site of 24 historical eruptions, located mostly on its upper section; by contrast, the volcano's southwestern rift zone has been relatively quiet, and has only been the site of five events to date.

Eruptive history

Prehistoric eruptions

Geologists have dated and documented dozens of major eruptions over the volcano's long history, bridging the long gap between Kīlauea's oldest known rock and only extremely recent written records and historical observation. Historical lava flows from the volcano are generally recovered by scientists in one of three ways. The oldest flows, dating back 275,000 to 225,000 years, have been recovered from Kīlauea's submerged southern slope by ship-towed remotely operated vehicles. These lavas exhibit forms characteristic of early, submerged preshield-stage eruptive episodes, from when the volcano was still a rising seamount that had not yet breached the ocean surface, and their surface exposure is unusual, as in most other volcanoes such lavas would have since been buried by more recent flows.

The second method of recovering older rock is through the drilling of deep core samples; however, the cores have proved difficult to date, and several samples from depths of around  that suggested dates as old as 450,000 years have since been found erroneous. More reliable paleomagnetic dating, limited to rocks dating from after Kīlauea's emergence from the sea, has suggested ages of around 50,000 years. Exposed flows above sea level have proved far younger. This date is similar to that of the oldest dated extant lava flow, a southwestern rift zone flow with an uncorrected radiocarbon dating of approximately 4650 BC.

The oldest well-studied eruptive product from Kīlauea is the Uwēkahuna Ash Member, the product of explosive eruptions between 2,800 and 2,100 years ago. Evidence suggests the existence of an active eruptive center at this time, termed the Powers Caldera, whose fractures and faults lie  outside the modern caldera. At least 1,200 years ago, lava from the Powers Caldera overtopped its rim and solidified the structure; this was followed by a period of very voluminous tube-fed pāhoehoe flows from the summit. Following cessation of activity around 400 years ago, eruptions re-centered on the eastern part of Kīlauea's summit, and concurrently activity increased at the northern end of the eastern rift zone.

 1410 to 1790 
The longest-duration major eruption witnessed by native Hawaiians took place from about 1410 to 1470. Lasting around 60 years,  the 'Ailā'au eruption's effusive flow covered most of Kīlauea, north of the East Rift Zone in what is known as the Puna District. Most likely due to the duration of this flow, the summit collapsed around the period of 1470-1510, creating the caldera that is known today. These major discoveries of the 60-year long 'Ailā'au flow over Puna, and the collapse of the summit in the formation of the caldera afterwards were largely supplemented by translations of native Hawaiian chants on the mythology of Pele and Hi'iaka; these events have been interpreted from the following story.

After arriving in Hawai'i, Pele made Kīlauea her home and sent her sister Hi'iaka to retrieve Lohi'au, an attractive man she met on Kaua'i, on the condition that Pele would protect the forests of Puna if Hi'iaka returned in 40 days. As the journey lasted longer than 40 days, Pele set fire to the forest. When Hi'iaka finally returned to Kīlauea with Lohi'au and made the smoky discovery, she became angry and made love to Lohi'au right in front of Pele. In retaliation, Pele then killed Lohi'au before throwing him in a pit on the summit of Kīlauea where Hi'iaka started digging ferociously, letting rocks fly everywhere to recover his body. These two main events are interpreted to represent the 60-year long 'Ailā'au flow over Puna, and the collapse of the summit in the formation of the caldera afterwards. In addition to the native Hawaiian oral history of these major events, geologists have been able to study and confirm them with radiocarbon and paleomagnetic dating.

Following this effusive period and caldera collapse, Kīlauea entered a 300-year period of explosive eruptions from around 1510 to 1790 as discovered by the radiocarbon dating of the Keanakākoʻi Tephra. This tephra was formed after eruptions hundreds of meters into the sky led to ash covering the area.

1790 to 1934
The earliest reliable written records of historical activity date back to about 1820, and the first well-documented eruption by westerners occurred in 1823, when the volcano was first put under observation.  One pre-contact eruption in particular, a phreatomagmatic event in 1790,  was responsible for the death of a party of warriors, part of the army of Keōua Kuahuula, the last island chief to resist Kamehameha I's rule; their death is evidenced by a set of footprints preserved within the Hawai‘i Volcanoes National Park which are listed on the National Register of Historic Places. Kīlauea has been the site of 61 separate eruptions since 1823, easily making it one of the most active volcanoes on Earth.

During its observed history, the volume of lava erupted by Kīlauea has varied widely. The period between 1840 and 1920 saw approximately half that in eruptive volume, and in the thirty years between then and about 1950, the volcano was unusually quiet and exhibited very little activity; Kīlauea's eruptive volume has increased steadily since then, with present activity comparable to that of the early 1800s.

The length and origin of these eruptions have also varied. Events last anywhere between days and years, and occur at a number of different sites. Half of all eruptions occur at or near Kīlauea's summit caldera. Activity there was nearly continuous for much of the 19th century, and after a reprieve between 1894 and 1907, continued onwards until 1924. There have been five historical eruptions at the volcano's relatively quiet southwestern rift zone, and 24 along its more active eastern rift zone, mostly along its upper section.

The volcano's observed history has mostly been one of effusive eruptions; however, this is a relatively recent occurrence. Prior to the arrival of the first Europeans on the island, Kīlauea was the site of regular explosive activity, evidenced then by tribal chants referencing the volcano's fickle nature, and today by geological records of an explosively active mode of past activity. Although explosive activity still occurs at the volcano, it is not as intense as it once was, and the volcano would become much more dangerous to the general public if it returned to its old phase of activity once more.

Halemaʻumaʻu, then a small upwelling in the caldera floor, was topped by a lava lake that then drained, before refilling again, forming an enormous lava lake and nearly reaching the top edge of the caldera before draining once more. This activity eventually gave way to the construction of Mauna Iki, building up the large lava shield on the volcano's southwest rift zone over a period of eight months. The eruption also featured concurrent rift activity and a large amount of lava fountaining.

Activity in 1921–1923 followed. The next major eruption occurred in 1924. Halemaʻumaʻu, a fully formed pit crater after the 1919 event and the site of a sizable lava lake, first drained, then quickly began sinking into the ground, deepening to nearly  beneath a thick cloud of volcanic ash. The eruption continued and formed numerous eruption columns up to and beyond  in height, before slowly petering down and ending by May 28. Volcanic activity was soon confined to the summit, and ceased completely after 1934.

1952 to 1982

After the Halemaumau event, Kīlauea remained relatively quiet, and for a time, completely silent, with all activity confined to the summit. Multiple continuous lava fountains between  persisted, and the eruption lasted 136 days. Eruptions occurred soon after in 1954, 1955, and 1959, capped by a large event in 1960, when fissure-based phreatic eruption and earthquake activity gave way to a massive ʻaʻā flow that overran multiple evacuated communities and resorts; the resulting summit deflation eventually caused the ever-active Halemaumau to collapse even further.

From 1960 on, eruptive events occurred frequently until August 2018. The period 1967–1968 saw a particularly large, 80-million-cubic-meter, 251-day event from Halemaʻumaʻu. This event was superseded the very next year by the marathon Mauna Ulu eruption, a large effusive eruption which lasted from May 24, 1969, to July 24, 1974, and added  of new land to the island. After eruptive activity had died down, there was a magnitude 7.2 earthquake that caused a partial summit collapse, after which activity did not resume at Kīlauea until 1977. At the time, Mauna Ulu was the longest flank eruption of any Hawaiian volcano in recorded history. The eruption created a new vent, covered a large area of land with lava, and added new land to the island. The eruption started as a fissure between two pit craters, Āloi and Alae, where the Mauna Ulu shield would eventually form. Both pāhoehoe and aā lava erupted from the volcano. Early on, fountains of lava burst out as much as 540 meters (1772 ft) high. In early 1973, an earthquake occurred that caused Kīlauea to briefly stop erupting near the original Mauna Ulu site and instead erupt near the craters Pauahi and Hiiaka.

1983–2018

The longest major eruption observed at Kīlauea in modern history occurred from January 1983 to September 2018. It had the longest duration of any observed eruption at this volcano. , it is the twelfth-longest duration volcanic eruption on Earth since 1750. The eruption began on January 3, 1983, along the eastern rift zone. The vent produced vigorous lava fountains that quickly built up into the Puʻu ʻŌʻō cone, sending lava flows down the volcano's slope.

In 1986, activity shifted down the rift to a new vent, named Kūpaianahā, where it took on a more effusive character. Kūpaianahā built up a low, broad volcanic shield, and lava tubes fed flows extending 11 to 12 km (about 7 mi) to the sea. Between 1986 and 1991, the connection between Chain of Craters Road and Hawaii Route 130 was cut, and the community of Kapa’ahu, the village of Kalapana, and the subdivisions of Kālapana Gardens and Royal Gardens were lost to the lava. A black sand beach at Kaimū was also engulfed. In 1992, the eruption moved back to Puʻu ʻŌʻō, but continued in the same manner, covering nearly all of the 1983–86 lava flows and large areas of coastline.

In addition to the nearly continuous activity at Puu Oo and other vents on the east rift zone, a separate eruption began at Kilauea's summit in March 2008. On March 19, 2008, following several months of increased sulfur dioxide emissions and seismic tremor, a new vent opened at Halemaʻumaʻu at Kilauea's summit in an explosive eruption. Following this event, the new crater formed in the explosion, informally named the "Overlook Crater," emitted a thick gas plume that obscured views into the vent. Several other explosive events occurred at the vent throughout 2008.

On September 5, 2008, scientists observed a lava pond deep within the Overlook Crater for the first time. Beginning in February 2010, a lava pond was visible at the bottom of the crater almost continuously through the beginning of May 2018. Lava briefly overflowed the vent onto the floor of Halemaʻumaʻu in April and May 2015, October 2016, and April 2018.Global Volcanism Program, 2017. Report on Kilauea (United States). In: Venzke, E (ed.), Bulletin of the Global Volcanism Network, 42:8. Smithsonian Institution.

2018 eruptive episodes

Beginning in March 2018, Hawaiian Volcano Observatory began to detect rapid inflation at Pu‘u ‘Ō‘ō, leading scientists to warn that the increased pressure could lead to the formation of a new vent at Kilauea.

Following weeks of increased pressure, the crater floor of the cone of Puʻu ʻŌʻō collapsed on April 30, 2018, as magma migrated underground into the lower Puna region of Kilauea's lower east rift zone. Over the next few days, hundreds of small earthquakes were detected on Kīlauea's East rift zone, leading officials to issue evacuation warnings. On May 3, 2018, new fissures formed, and lava began erupting in lower Puna after a 5.0 earthquake earlier in the day, causing evacuations of the Leilani Estates and Lanipuna Gardens subdivisions.

A seemingly related 6.9 magnitude earthquake occurred on May 4. By May 9, 27 houses had been destroyed in Leilani Estates.

By May 21, two lava flows had reached the Pacific Ocean, creating thick clouds of laze (a toxic lava and haze cloud), which is made up of hydrochloric acid and glass particles.

By May 31, 87 houses in Leilani Estates and nearby areas had been destroyed by lava. Advancing lava flows caused additional evacuation orders, including the town of Kapoho. By June 4, with the lava having crossed through Kapoho and entered the ocean, the confirmed number of houses lost had reached 159. Two weeks later, the confirmed number of homes lost was 533, and as of June 25 it had risen to 657.

Effect of the 2018 lower Puna eruption on Kīlauea's summit
 Together with the outbreak of lava in lower Puna, a lava lake at Halemaʻumaʻu at Kilauea's summit began to drop on May 2, 2018. The Hawaiian Volcano Observatory warned that the lowering of the lava lake increased the potential for phreatic (steam) explosions at the summit caused by interaction of magma with the underground water table, similar to the explosions that occurred at Halemaumau in 1924. These concerns prompted the closure of Hawaii Volcanoes National Park. On May 17, at approximately 4:15 a.m., an explosive eruption occurred at Halemaumau, creating a plume of ash 30,000 feet into the air. This marked the beginning of a series of vigorous explosions that produced significant ash plumes from Halemaumau. These explosions, accompanied by large earthquakes and inward slumping and collapse within and around Halemaʻumaʻu, continued until early August.Changes in the Kīlauea caldera from May 14 to July 19, 2018 (Planet Labs Inc.)

2019–20: Water lake appears at the summit
In late July 2019, a water lake appeared on the bottom of Halemaʻumaʻu for the first time in over 200 years, as water from the rebounding water table began entering the crater. Afterward, the crater lake gradually grew in size. Within a month, the water lake would be replaced by a lava lake during the new eruption.

December 2020 – May 2021 summit eruption

On December 20, 2020, at 9:30 PM local time, an eruption broke out within Halemaʻumaʻu at Kīlauea's summit caldera. The US Geological Survey's Hawaiian Volcano Observatory reported that three vents were feeding lava into the bottom of Halemaʻumaʻu Crater, boiling off the water lake that had been growing since summer 2019 and replacing it with a lava lake. The eruption created a plume that reached  in elevation. The eruption was preceded by earthquake swarms centered at Kīlauea Caldera on November 30, 2020, and December 2, 2020, the second of which was interpreted as a small intrusion of magma. By the following morning, emergency officials reported that the eruption had stabilized and that two of the three vents remained active and continued to fill the floor of Halemaʻumaʻu with lava. A spatter cone had also formed around the western vent.

The eruption continued for another few months, though activity steadily decreased. On May 26, 2021, the Hawaiian Volcano Observatory announced that Kīlauea was no longer erupting. Lava supply to the lava lake appeared to have ceased between May 11 and May 13, and the lava lake had completely crusted over by May 20. The last surface activity in Halemaʻumaʻu was observed on May 23.

On August 23, 2021, the Hawaiian Volcano Observatory raised Kīlauea's alert status from "Yellow/Advisory" to "Orange/Watch" due to an earthquake swarm and a concurrent increase in ground deformation at the volcano's summit. The observatory stated that the activity potentially indicated "the shallow movement of magma beneath the south part of Kīlauea caldera." The observatory lowered Kīlauea's alert status back to "Yellow/Advisory" two days later after the earthquake swarm and ground deformation waned.

September 2021 summit eruption

The Hawaiian Volcano Observatory began to record increased earthquake activity and changes in ground deformation patterns at Kīlauea's summit at about noon local time on September 29, 2021. An eruption began at 3:20 p.m. local time when several fissures opened within Halemaʻumaʻu crater in Kīlauea's summit caldera.

Lava continued to erupt at Halemaʻumaʻu throughout the fall. Overflight measurements from October 5, 2022, indicated that  of lava had been effused, and that the floor of Halemaʻumaʻu had risen , since the beginning of this eruption on September 29, 2021. The eruption paused on December 9, and the alert level was reduced accordingly on December 13, 2022, though seismic activity was still unsettled.

Eruptive activity within Halemaʻumaʻu resumed on January 5, 2023. The Halema'uma'u eruption ended 61 days later on March 7, 2023.

Hazards
Future threats
In 2018, the United States Geological Survey National Volcanic Threat Assessment gave Kīlauea an overall threat score of 263, and ranked it first among volcanoes in the United States most likely to threaten lives and infrastructure.

There was concern that the presence of a water lake in Halemaʻumaʻu following the 2018 summit collapse meant that Kīlauea's next summit eruption might be explosive if magma rose rapidly to the surface. However, when Kīlauea erupted in December 2020, the eruption was non-explosive in nature, with three vents feeding magma into the lake and boiling off the water.

Volcanic Explosivity Index
The Global Volcanism Program has assigned a Volcanic Explosivity Index (VEI; the higher the number, the more explosive) to all except six of Kīlauea's ninety-six known eruptions of the last 11,700 years. The eruption of 1790 has a VEI of 4. The 1983–2018 eruption has a VEI of 3. The eruptions of 1820, 1924, 1959 and 1960 have a VEI of 2. The eruptions of 680, 1050, 1490, 1500, 1610, 1868 and four eruptions in 1961 have a VEI of 1. The other seventy-four eruptions have a VEI of 0.

 Oral traditions 
Native Hawaiians have passed down ancient oral traditions surrounding the volcanoes ever since they settled on the islands. When it comes to hazards management, there is a lot of information that can be taken from these oral histories as they are rich in cultural and geologic knowledge. In the field of volcanology, the use of oral history has not been a common practice until recent years, but geologists now recognize they can be used as a vital resource for understanding and predicting the eruption history of a given region. While oral history can and has been used to confirm previously known geologic data, it can also be used to assess the volcanic hazards before, during and after an eruption, in addition to the rehabilitation of communities afterwards.

Using the oral history of the 'Ailā'au eruption, summit collapse, and explosive period following, volcanologists recognize that Kīlauea is much more explosive than previously thought. And given the recent effusive eruption history in the past century, it is predicted that a long period of explosive eruptions will return next.

Ecology
Background

The majority of the species present on the island are endemic to it and can be found nowhere else on Earth, the result of an isolated evolutionary lineage sheltered from external biotic influence; this makes its ecosystem vulnerable both to invasive species and human development, and an estimated third of the island's natural flora and fauna has already gone extinct.

Kīlauea's ecological community is additionally threatened by the activity of the volcano itself; lava flows often overrun sections of the volcano's forests and burn them down, and volcanic ash distributed by explosive eruptions often smothers local plant life. Layers of carbonized organic material at the bottom of Kīlauea ash deposits are evidence of the many times the volcano has wrought destruction on its own ecosystem and that of its neighbor Mauna Loa, and parts of the volcano present a dichotomy between pristine montane forest and recently buried volcanic "deserts" yet to be recolonized.

Kīlauea's bulk affects local climate conditions through the influence of trade winds coming predominantly from the northeast, which, when squeezed upwards by the volcano's height, result in a moister windward side and a comparatively arid leeward flank. The volcano's ecology is further complicated by height, though not nearly as much as with its other, far taller neighbors, and by the local distribution of volcanic products, making for varied soil conditions. The northern part of Kīlauea is mostly below  and receives more than  mean annual rainfall, and can mostly be classified as a lowland wet community; farther south, the volcano has squeezed out much of the precipitation and receives less than  mean annual rainfall, and is considered mostly a lowland dry environment.

Ecosystems

Much of Kīlauea's southern ecosystem lies within the Hawaiʻi Volcanoes National Park, where a’e ferns, ʻōhiʻa trees (Metrosideros polymorpha), and hapu’u of the genus Cibotium are common. The park hosts a large variety of bird species, including the 'apapane (Himatione sanguinea); the 'amakihi (Hemignathus virens); the 'i'iwi (Vestiaria coccinea); the ‘ōma’o (Myadestes obscurus), the  ʻelepaio (Chasiempis sp.); and the endangered 'akepa (Loxops coccineus), 'akiapola'au (Hemignathus munroi), nēnē (Branta sandvicensis), ʻuaʻu (Pterodroma sandwichensis), and ʻio (Buteo solitarius) species. The Kīlauea coast also hosts three of the nine known critically endangered hawksbill sea turtle (Eretmochelys imbricata) nesting sites on the island.

Some of the area alongside Kīlauea's southwestern rift zone takes the form of the unusual Kaʻū Desert. Although not a "true" desert (rainfall there exceeds the maximum  a year), precipitation mixing with drifting volcanic sulfur dioxide forms acid rain with a pH as low as 3.4, greatly hampering regional plant growth. The deposited tephra particulates make the local soil very permeable. Plant life in the region is practically nonexistent.

Kīlauea's northern lowland wet-forest ecosystem is partially protected by the Puna Forest Reserve and the Kahauale`a Natural Area Reserve. At , Wao Kele in particular is Hawaii's largest lowland wet forest reserve, and is home to rare plant species including hāpuu ferns (Cibotium spp.), 'ie'ie vines (Freycinetia arborea), and kōpiko (Psychotria mariniana), some of which play a role in limiting invasive species' spread. Opeapea (Lasiurus cinereus semotus) io (Buteo solitarius), common amakihi (Hemignathus virens), and nananana makakii (Theridion grallator)  live in the trees. There are thought to be many more as-yet-undocumented species within the forest. Wao Kele's primary forest tree is ōhia lehua (Metrosideros polymorpha).

Human history
Ancient Hawaiian
The first Ancient Hawaiians to arrive on Hawaii island lived along the shores, where food and water were plentiful. Flightless birds that had previously known no predators became a staple food source. Early settlements had a major impact on the local ecosystem, and caused many extinctions, particularly amongst bird species, as well as introducing foreign plants and animals and increasing erosion rates. The prevailing lowland forest ecosystem was transformed from forest to grassland; some of this change was caused by the use of fire, but the main reason appears to have been the introduction of the Polynesian rat (Rattus exulans'').

The summits of the five volcanoes of Hawaii are revered as sacred mountains. Hawaiians associated elements of their natural environment with particular deities. In Hawaiian mythology, the sky father Wākea marries the earth mother Papa, giving birth to the Hawaiian Islands. Kīlauea itself means "spewing" or "much spreading" in Hawaiian, referencing its high state of activity, and in Hawaiian mythology, Kīlauea is the body of the deity Pele, goddess of fire, lightning, wind, and volcanoes. It is here that the conflict between Pele and the rain god Kamapuaa was centered; Halemaumau, "House of the amaumau fern", derives its name from the struggle between the two gods. Kamapuaa, hard-pressed by Pele's ability to make lava spout from the ground at will, covered the feature, a favorite residence of the goddess, with fern fronds. Choked by trapped smoke, Pele emerged. Realizing that each could threaten the other with destruction, the other gods called a draw and divided the island between them, with Kamapuaa getting the moist windward northeastern side, and Pele directing the drier Kona (or leeward) side. The rusty singed appearance of the young fronds of the amaumau is said to be a product of the legendary struggle.

This early era was followed by peace and cultural expansion between the 12th and late 18th century. Land was divided into regions designed for both the immediate needs of the populace and the long-term welfare of the environment. These ahupuaa generally took the form of long strips of land oriented from the mountain summits to the coast.

Modern era

The first foreigner to arrive at Hawaii was James Cook in 1778. The first non-native to observe Kīlauea in detail was William Ellis, an English missionary who in 1823 spent more than two weeks trekking across the volcano. He collated the first written account of the volcano and observed many of its features, establishing a premise for future explorations of the volcano.

Another missionary, C. S. Stewart, U.S.N., wrote of it in his journal 'A Residence in the Sandwich Islands', which Letitia Elizabeth Landon quoted from in the notes to her poetical illustration to an engraving of a painting by William Ellis after F Howard, 'The Volcano of Ki-Rau-E-A' in Fisher's Drawing Room Scrap Book, 1832.

One of the earliest and most important surveyors of Kīlauea was James Dwight Dana, who, staying with the missionary Titus Coan, studied the island's volcanoes in detail for decades first-hand. Dana visited Kīlauea's summit and described it in detail in 1840. After publishing a summary paper in 1852, he directed a detailed geological study of the island in 1880 and 1881 but did not consider Kīlauea a separate volcano, instead referring to it as a flank vent of Mauna Loa; it was not until another geologist, C. E. Dutton, had elaborated on Dana's research during an 1884 expedition that Kīlauea came to be generally accepted as a separate entity.

The next era of Kīlauea's history began with the establishment of the Hawaiian Volcano Observatory on the volcano's rim in 1912. The first permanent such installation in the United States, the observatory was the brainchild of Thomas Jaggar, head of geology at the Massachusetts Institute of Technology; after witnessing the devastation of the 1908 Messina earthquake near Mount Etna in Italy, he declared that something must be done to support systematic volcanic and seismic study, and chose Kīlauea as the site of the first such establishment. After securing initial funding from MIT and the University of Hawaiʻi, Jaggar took directorship of the observatory and, whilst its head between 1912 and 1940, pioneered seismological and observational study and observation of active volcanoes. After initial funding ran out, the Observatory was successively funded by the National Weather Service, the United States Geological Survey (USGS), and the National Park Service, before settling on the USGS, under whose banner the observatory has been operating since 1947. The main building has been moved twice since establishment, and today is positioned on the northwest rim of Kīlauea's caldera.

NASA used the area to geologically train the Apollo Astronauts in recognizing volcanic features, planning traverses, collecting samples and taking photographs.  Training took place in April 1969, April 1970, December 1970, December 1971, and June 1972. Astronauts of Apollo 12, Apollo 14, Apollo 15, Apollo 16 and Apollo 17 used this training on the Moon. Notable geologist instructors included William R. Muehlberger.

Research
In 2022, researchers reported that Kīlauea's seismic waves could be used to predict future outbreaks. The waves can last for tens of seconds. After the 2007 eruption ended, they analyzed thousands of events from seismic sensors, GPS stations, and lake height observations. They also considered variables such as temperature and gas bubble density. They reported that magma temperature was associated with seismic signal duration and bubble quantity and composition. Not all volcanoes have lava lakes that produce useful seismic signals.

Tourism

Kīlauea has been a tourist attraction since the 1840s, and local businessmen such as Benjamin Pitman and George Lycurgus ran a series of hotels at the rim, including Volcano House, which is still the only hotel or restaurant located within Hawaiʻi Volcanoes National Park.

In 1891, Lorrin A. Thurston, grandson of the American missionary Asa Thurston and investor in hotels along the volcano's rim, began campaigning for a park on the volcano's slopes, an idea first proposed by William Richards Castle, Jr. in 1903. Thurston, who owned the Honolulu Advertiser newspaper, printed editorials in favor of the idea; by 1911 Governor Walter F. Frear had proposed a draft bill to create  "Kilauea National Park". Following endorsements from John Muir, Henry Cabot Lodge, and former President Theodore Roosevelt (in opposition to local ranchers) and several legislative attempts introduced by delegate Jonah Kūhiō Kalaniana'ole, House Resolution 9525 was signed into law by Woodrow Wilson on August 1, 1916. It was the 11th National Park in the United States, and the first in a Territory; a few weeks later, the National Park Service Organic Act was signed into law, creating the National Park Service and tasking it with running the expanding system. Originally called "Hawaii National Park", it was split from the Haleakala National Park on September 22, 1960. Today, the park, renamed the Hawaiʻi Volcanoes National Park, is a major conservatory agency and tourist attraction, and, since 1987, a World Heritage Site.

In its early days, tourism was a relatively new concept, but grew slowly before exploding with the advent of jet airliner travel around 1959, the year Hawaii became a state. Today, tourism is driven by the island's exotic tropical locations, and Kīlauea, being one of the few volcanoes in the world in a more or less constant state of moderate eruption, was a major part of the island's tourist draw. According to the National Park Service, Kīlauea is visited by roughly 2.6 million people annually, most of whom proceeded to visit the volcano from the Kilauea Visitor Center near the park entrance. The Thomas A. Jaggar Museum was also a popular tourist stop. Located at the edge of Kīlauea Caldera, the museum's observation deck offered the best sheltered view on the volcano of the activity at Halemaʻumaʻu; however, the museum closed indefinitely after the building housing it sustained structural damage from earthquakes associated with the 2018 eruptive episodes.

The Volcano House provides lodging within the park, while additional housing options are available in the nearby Volcano Village. Visitors associated with the military can find lodging at the Kilauea Military Camp. The park provides a number of hiking trails, points of interest, and guided ranger programs.

References

Further reading

External links

Hawaiian Volcano Observatory's Kīlauea website
Live webcams of Kīlauea and Mauna Loa
USGS updates on Kilauea's Lava (and water) lakes, May 11, 2022
Hawaii Volcanoes National Park website
Hawaii Groundwater & Geothermal Resources Center by the University of Hawaiʻi at Mānoa
The Geothermal Collection by University of Hawaiʻi at Mānoa
Video footage of the March 2011 Kamoamoa Fissure Eruption and the collapse of Puʻu ʻŌʻō crater

Active volcanoes
Volcanoes of the Island of Hawaii
Hawaiʻi Volcanoes National Park
Mountains of Hawaii
Shield volcanoes of the United States
Calderas of Hawaii
Polygenetic shield volcanoes
Holocene volcanoes
Holocene Oceania
Cenozoic Hawaii
VEI-4 volcanoes